Big Brother is the British version of the international reality television franchise Big Brother created by producer John de Mol in 1997. Broadcast yearly from 2000 to 2018, and due to return in 2023, the show follows the format of other national editions, in which a group of contestants, known as "housemates", live together in a specially constructed house that is isolated from the outside world. They are continuously monitored by live television cameras and personal audio microphones. Throughout the competition, housemates are "evicted" from the house by public televoting. The last remaining housemate wins the competition and a cash prize. The series takes its name from the oppressive character known by that name in George Orwell's 1949 novel Nineteen Eighty-Four.

The series premiered in 2000 on Channel 4 and immediately became a ratings hit. It featured a 24-hour live feed in which fans could view inside the house at any time. Big Brother aired for eleven series on Channel 4, followed by one final special edition, Ultimate Big Brother, which ended in 2010. Channel 5 acquired the rights to the series, and relaunched it in 2011. On the day of the nineteenth series launch in 2018, Channel 5 announced that Big Brother would not be returning to the channel after the end of that series. In 2020, Channel 4 announced that previous episodes of Big Brother would be shown on E4 in a series titled Big Brother: Best Shows Ever to mark the 20th anniversary of the programme. Two years later, on 1 August 2022, it was announced by ITV that Big Brother would return for a new series in 2023 on ITV2.

The programme was initially presented by Davina McCall from its inception until its cancellation by Channel 4. McCall declined to return as presenter following the programme's move to Channel 5, and the role was taken up by former series winner Brian Dowling. He remained as presenter  throughout the twelfth and thirteenth series. Emma Willis later replaced Dowling from the fourteenth series onwards until its cancellation from Channel 5. Marcus Bentley served as off-screen narrator of all series since the show premiered in 2000. Big Brother has had numerous spin-off series occur since its premiere, most notably Celebrity Big Brother, a shorter version of the main series wherein the cast is composed solely of celebrities. Numerous other spin-off series that are not competition based have aired, with Dermot O'Leary, Russell Brand, George Lamb, Emma Willis and Rylan Clark-Neal all presenting spin-offs.

History

Main series

Channel 4 (2000–2010)
The Big Brother reality series was created by John de Mol and premiered in the Netherlands. Following the success of the initial series, it was confirmed that editions for both the United Kingdom and the United States were in the works. In March 2000, it was revealed that the series would be broadcast by Channel 4 and E4; casting began shortly afterward, and Davina McCall was later revealed to be the presenter. The first series premiered on 18 July 2000, and ended when housemate Craig Phillips was crowned the winner after 64 days in the House. The series proved to be a hit early in its run, leading to a second series.

Big Brother 2 premiered on 25 May 2001, and continued the success of the previous series. The series concluded on 27 July 2001, when Brian Dowling was crowned the winner. The third series premiered on 24 May 2002, and was the first series to feature a live premiere. Much like the previous series', the show lasted for 64 days, and saw Kate Lawler win the prize. With the third series finding even more success than its predecessors, a fourth series began on 23 May 2003. The series was one of the first to feature numerous twists throughout the series, including nominations on the first night and swapping a housemate with a housemate from the African edition of the series. The series concluded after 64 days, with Cameron Stout being crowned the winner. Despite the fourth series seeing a decrease in viewership and voting numbers, a fifth series began on 28 May 2004. The series became one of the most controversial series at the time, mainly due to events such as "Fight Night" and the expulsion of two housemates. The series lasted for 71 days, with Nadia Almada becoming the first transgender housemate to win the series.

Following the success of the fifth series, the sixth series began on 27 May 2005, and lasted for a total of 78 days. The series was met with much controversy surrounding housemates Anthony Hutton and Makosi Musambasi, the former of which went on to win the series. The seventh series premiered on 18 May 2006, and became the first series to feature over twenty housemates. It became the first series to last longer than 90 days, and was met with much controversy after allowing previously evicted housemate Nikki Grahame to return to the game with the chance of winning. Pete Bennett was ultimately crowned the winner of the series. The following series premiered on 30 May 2007, and became the longest series to date at 94 days. The series featured a set of twins in the house, who competed initially as individuals but later became one housemate. Brian Belo was crowned the winner of the series. Belo was the only black housemate to win the programme. The ninth series featured a "Heaven and Hell" theme, and premiered on 5 June 2008. Rachel Rice was the winner of the series after spending 93 days in the house. On 4 June 2009, the tenth series premiered and saw housemates having to complete tasks in order to earn housemate status. Sophie Reade was the winner of the series, which lasted for a total of 93 days.

9 June 2010 saw the premiere of the eleventh series. It was also confirmed that 2010 would be the final year of Big Brother on Channel 4. The series lasted for a total of 77 days, with Josie Gibson being crowned the winner. Merely minutes after BB11 concluded, a special edition titled Ultimate Big Brother, featuring memorable former housemates competing for the title of "Ultimate Housemate". Big Brother 2 winner Brian Dowling, won the series after 18 days in the house.

Channel 5 (2011–2018)
After Richard Desmond bought Channel 5 in 2010, he stated that he was keen to acquire Big Brother. Meanwhile, Endemol had been granted permission to keep the Big Brother house at the Elstree TV Studios until 30 September 2013. On 2 April 2011, In August 2011, Channel 5 formally confirmed that they had signed a £200 million two-year contract with Endemol to screen Big Brother from 18 August 2011. Big Brother 2 winner Brian Dowling was announced as the new presenter. McCall declined the offer to present, having said goodbye to the show in 2010. On 3 May 2011, Endemol and Channel 5 officially opened the process for people to apply to be on the show. The twelfth series officially launched on 9 September 2011. Aaron Allard-Morgan was crowned the winner after spending 64 days in the house. The thirteenth series premiered on 5 June 2012, and was won by Luke Anderson.

On 2 April 2013, it was confirmed that Dowling would be replaced by Emma Willis, who had previously presented spin-off series' for the show. The fourteenth series premiered on 13 June 2013, and was won by Sam Evans. The fifteenth series launched on 5 June 2014 and was won by Helen Wood, making her the first female winner since the show's revival on Channel 5. The sixteenth series began on 12 May 2015, the earliest Big Brother launch to date. Chloe Wilburn was announced as the winner of that series. The seventeenth series launched on 7 June 2016, it was the first Big Brother series to feature two separate houses and with a series length of 50 days it was the shortest ever series of Big Brother to air in the sixteen years of the programme. The winner was stunt double Jason Burill. He was the oldest housemate to win the main series to date. The eighteenth series launched on 5 June 2017 and was won by Isabelle Warburton. She was the first woman to win Big Brother as a late entrant, and at just 38 days in the house she has also spent the least amount of time in the house for a winner of the regular series.

On 14 September 2018, Channel 5 announced that the nineteenth series would be the last on Channel 5. Cameron Cole was the winner of the final series, and the programme's youngest. Big Brother ended on Channel 5 in November 2018.

ITV2 (2023) 
In April 2022, it was reported that ITV Studios were in talks with Banijay, who own the rights to Big Brother, to revive the show in 2023. On 1 August 2022, ITV aired a teaser trailer during the final of the eighth series of Love Island, officially confirming that the series would return for a new series in 2023 on ITV2 and ITVX. The show is set to run in Q4 of 2023 for "up to six weeks" with housemates coming from "all walks of life".

Spin-offs

Since its inception, Big Brother has seen numerous spin-offs and tie-in series' launch on both Channel 4 and Channel 5. The most notable spin-off, Celebrity Big Brother, began initially as a one-time series and involved six celebrities staying in the house for eight days. Following the success of the series, Celebrity Big Brother went on to become an annual production, much like the main series. Following widespread media attention involving racism during the fifth series, the show was not broadcast the following year. The show returned in 2009, and the final series to air on Channel 4 aired in 2010. Following the show's move to Channel 5, Celebrity Big Brother began airing two series per year.

The show has also had various other spin-off series occur since its premiere. The first spin-off, Teen Big Brother: The Experiment, premiered on 13 October 2003 and lasted for a total of ten days. The series was met with much controversy, which was later heightened when two of the cast members had sex in the house. Big Brother Panto, which aired in 2004, saw the return of ten former housemates who re-enacted their rendition of Cinderella. Ultimate Big Brother was the final series to air on Channel 4, and featured fourteen of the most memorable housemates from both the main series and Celebrity Big Brother competing in the series. Brian Dowling became the only housemate to win a series twice after winning Ultimate Big Brother. Numerous other spin-offs have occurred throughout the series such as Big Brother's Big Mouth, presented by Russell Brand, and Big Brother's Little Brother presented by Dermot O'Leary. Following the show's move to Channel 5, Big Brother's Bit on the Side and Celebrity Big Brother were the only spin-off series now airing.

Format

Big Brother was a game show in which a group of contestants, referred to as housemates, live in isolation from the outside world in a custom built "house", constantly under video surveillance. During their time in the house, the housemates are required to nominate two of their fellow contestants for potential eviction, and the two or more with the most votes would be nominated. This process is mandatory for all housemates, and failure to comply could result in expulsion from the house. During the show's broadcast on Channel 4, the viewers would vote to evict one of the nominated housemates, and the housemate with the most votes would be removed from the house. The twelfth and thirteenth series, the first two to air under Channel 5, saw the public voting to save a housemate, and the housemate with the fewest votes would be evicted. Beginning with the fourteenth series, the vote to evict format returned to the series. During the eighteenth series, both vote to save and vote to evict were used. The voting process can be done via telephone or online. When the final week arrives, the viewers vote for which of the remaining housemates should win the series, and the housemate with the most votes becomes the winner. The prize fund has varied throughout the series, ranging from £50,000 to £150,000.

During their time in the house, housemates are given weekly tasks to perform. The housemates wager a portion of their weekly shopping budget on the task, and either win double their wagered fund or lose the wagered fund depending on their performance in the task. The housemates are required to work as a group to complete their tasks, with the format of the tasks varying based on the number of remaining housemates. Throughout the series, some housemates have been given secret tasks that must either be completed individually or with a small group; failure to do so can result in the housemate being nominated or punished in the house. Should the housemates run out of the food provided for them, an emergency ration is available to them. The housemates are forbidden from discussing nominations, and doing so could result in punishment. The format of the series is mainly seen as a social experiment, and requires housemates to interact with others who may have differing ideals, beliefs, and prejudices. Housemates are also required to make visits to the diary room during their stay in the house, where they are able to share their thoughts and feelings on their fellow housemates and the game.

House
For the first two series, the house was located in Bow, London, near the 3 Mills Studios. After planning permission expired in 2002, Newham London Borough Council ordered the complex to be returned to a natural habitat. The house had been located at Elstree Studios, Borehamwood, Hertfordshire since Big Brother 3 in 2002. Following a break in during the second series, it was reported that security had increased to the point that the house was more secure than Buckingham Palace. The interior of the house has changed each year, reflecting a certain theme or twist in the game. The fifth series, which featured stricter rules and consequences, featured a harsh colour scheme and a claustrophobic setting. The third series featured a "Rich and Poor" twist, thus a row of bars was placed in the centre of the house to divide the housemates. The diary room features a different design each year, and was frequently the last room of the house to be revealed to the public. Each series has featured a garden in the house, which has included outdoor furniture, a Jacuzzi, and on some occasions other luxuries. The eighth series featured an "inside out" theme for the house, thus items such as the refrigerator were located in the garden.

On 2 February 2016, a planning application to Hertsmere Borough Council first revealed that Endemol had applied to build a new extension to the house, which would be its biggest renovation to the house since it was built in 2002. The documents teased a second house with another garden, as well as a new exterior set and interview studio. The old eviction set and eye studio were both demolished following the conclusion of Celebrity Big Brother 17. It was later announced on 18 March 2016 that permission had been granted with no objections. Despite the overall extension, the new outdoor set was smaller than before, holding a capacity of just 400 compared to 470 beforehand.

From Celebrity Big Brother 19, the other house was referred to as The Task Building making it the house's third task room along with the small and large task room.

In January 2019 (two months after the conclusion of the nineteenth and final series), work began to demolish the house at Elstree Studios. On 17 February 2019, former presenter Emma Willis posted a picture to her Instagram showing that demolition work on the house was complete.

It was then announced by ITV that their Bovingdon studios backlot would have the new house.

Broadcast

During the premiere series, the show aired six nights a week, being every night excluding Saturday. The eviction episodes and final aired on Fridays; after series presenter McCall announced the evictee, they had two hours to pack their belongings and exit the house during a second episode airing that night. The remaining five weekly shows were highlight episodes, which lasted an hour in length; the Sunday episode featured a group of psychologists discussing the events of the house. The second series aired six nights a week during the premiere week, though was reduced to only five days afterward, not airing on Saturday or Sunday. This series featured two eviction episodes as well, though only featured a ninety-minute gap between the two. Big Brother 3 was the first series to air every night each week, and every series thereafter featured only thirty minutes between eviction episodes. The third series was the first in the main series to feature a live launch, with all subsequent series featuring a live launch. The series continued to air for seven nights a week until Big Brother 8, which aired every night excluding Saturday. The ninth series re-introduced the seven episodes per week format, which has been continued throughout all future series'. When the series premiered, it was aired in a 4:3 aspect ratio instead of the more common 16:9 widescreen format seen by other series at the time. Beginning in 2006 with the seventh series, the show was broadcast in the 16:9 format. Following the show's move to Channel 5, it was broadcast in HD. The series can be viewed on Demand 5, a branch of Channel 5, after it airs.

Aside from the main series, the show featured a live feed into the house where viewers could watch the housemates at any time. With the series debut in 2000, the twenty-four-hour live feed was introduced which was available at any time to viewers for free. The live feed featured an estimated ten-minute delay to comply with broadcasting standards. Beginning with the second series, the live feed became available on E4 as well. In 2009, it was confirmed that the live feeds would not return for the tenth series due to a "small uptake" of subscriptions in the previous year. The feeds did return the following year, though required viewers to pay a fee, for what was at the time slated to be the show's final series. Following the show's move to Channel 5, the live feeds have not been featured for any subsequent series. In 2013, it was announced that the live feed would return in the form of a two-hour nightly show that featured a live look into the House; the show was cancelled in June of that year, reportedly due to low ratings. Despite this, the feed was re-instated onto the official Channel 5 website for the remainder of the fourteenth series.

Numerous spin-off series have aired either immediately after or shortly following both the highlight episodes and the live episodes. Big Brother's Big Mouth, aired following the highlight shows. The show was initially presented by Russell Brand from 2004 to 2007, but he did not return for subsequent series which featured a different presenter weekly. Big Brother's Big Mouth did not return following the show's move to Channel 5. Throughout the third, fourth, and fifth series' there were no weekly tasks, and the housemates instead participated in tasks during the Saturday Night Live weekly show. Big Brother's Big Brain also aired once per week, and featured a more psychological analysis of the series; it aired for two series, being renamed Big Brother: On the Couch for its second and final series. Big Brother's Bit on the Side was aired seven nights a week on Channel 5 and 5*, either immediately following or an hour after the nightly episode. Live from the House, which features a live feed into the house, airs immediately following the live eviction episode.

The opening theme for the series was both written and produced by Elementfour, which was a collaboration between Paul Oakenfold and Andy Gray. Following the success of the first series, the theme was released as a single on 28 August 2000. The single proved to be successful, reaching number 4 on the UK Singles Chart. The theme was also featured on the soundtrack for the first series, which was released that same year. Since the series premiered, there have been numerous remixes and changes made to the song. The original theme by Oakenfeld and Gray was used through the first five series, however was later replaced by a revamped version from the sixth series onward. The song was remixed with a Christmas theme to promote Big Brother Panto in 2004, while a carnival themed edition was made to promote the final series to air on Channel 4. The intro to each series, which featured the theme song, was often based on the twist or theme of the house for the year. Each series was promoted with a different eye logo, with the logo also representing the theme of the house. The eye logo is meant to symbolize the phrase "Big Brother is watching" taken from the Orwell novel. The logo for the first series was a close-up of housemate Melanie Hill's eye, while the logos for the second through eleventh series' were created by Daniel Eatock. Design team Hello Charlie, who had previously created the series intros, created the eye logo for the twelfth and thirteenth series following the show's move to Channel 5. The fourteenth to eighteenth series logos were created by the design studio Shop.

Legacy

Since its premiere, Big Brother has been the centre of much publicity, and has received much media attention. The series often receives coverage from tabloid newspapers, magazines, and online bloggers. The series has been a ratings success since it premiered, with the first eviction tally receiving 387,000 votes. The eviction episode itself received a total of 3.4 million viewers. The series continued to have successful viewership, with the third series finale reaching over 9.9 million viewers. The vote for the third series finale saw over 8.6 million viewers voting for whom should win the series. A number of books have been written about the series, including Big Brother: The Official Unseen Story by Jean Ritchie, The Psychology of Big Brother by Dan Jones, and Visible Thought: The New Psychology of Body Language by Geoffrey Beattie. Narinder Kaur, who had previously appeared as a housemate in the second series, went on to release Big Brother: The Inside Story.

Following their appearance on the series, numerous former housemates went on to enjoy moderate fame and success in the public eye. Most notably, Big Brother 3 housemate Jade Goody went on to have a successful career in reality television and later went on to appear in the fifth edition of Celebrity Big Brother. Goody died in 2009 due to cancer. Following her appearance on the series, Goody has frequently been referred to as one of the most successful former housemates. Following the initial conclusion of the series in 2010, a special titled Jade Goody: Ultimate Housemate aired on Channel 4 in memory of Goody. Housemates such as Alison Hammond, Brian Dowling, and Aisleyne Horgan-Wallace have enjoyed considerable success appearing in television series and reality television following their appearance on Big Brother. Housemates Nadia Almada, Craig Phillips, and Nichola Holt all released music following their appearance on the series, with Phillips ultimately having the most success. Nikki Grahame, who rose to fame in the seventh series, had her own television series titled Princess Nikki that ran for six weeks on E4. She later went on to appear in numerous reality television series. Chanelle Hayes, who appeared on the eighth series, went on to release a single, work as a model, and receive her own reality television series.

The series has gone on to be spoofed and parodied by comedians such as Alan Carr, Justin Lee Collins, and Ricky Gervais. The series has been parodied and re-enacted on programs such as The Friday Night Project, an episode of Doctor Who ("Bad Wolf"), and Extras. The Ben Elton novel Dead Famous, published in 2001, is a murder-mystery novel in a setting similar to that of Big Brother. In October 2008, E4 aired the horror series Dead Set which was set during a fictional series of Big Brother. The series featured numerous former housemates, as well as presenter Davina McCall in various roles throughout the series.

Series details and viewership

Sponsorships

Channel 4 (2000–2010)

Channel 5 (2011–2018)

ITV2 (2023)

 In 2002 BT Cellnet changed its name to O2, the sponsor is therefore the same as the previous series
 The cost of this sponsorship was £2.5 million
 Although the change of the name of the sponsor, it is still the same company and the same sponsor adverts were used
 This sponsorship is only shown after 9.00pm

Controversies and criticism

Since its inception, Big Brother has come under fire for reports of bullying, racism, rigging, and the physical and mental strain of appearing on the series.

Awards and nominations

See also
 Big Brother franchise
 List of Big Brother housemates

Footnotes

External links

 Big Brother  at Channel5.com (inactive)
 Big Brother at Channel4.com (inactive)
 

 
2000 British television series debuts
2000s British reality television series
2010s British reality television series

BAFTA winners (television series)
British television series based on Dutch television series
British television series revived after cancellation
Cultural history of the United Kingdom
English-language television shows
Television series by Endemol
Television shows filmed in England
Television shows shot at Elstree Film Studios